Chattancourt is a commune, in the Meuse department, in Grand Est, in north-eastern France.

See also
Communes of the Meuse department

References

Communes of Meuse (department)